is the thirty-second single by the Japanese rock band Buck-Tick, released on July 4, 2012.

Charts
The single peaked at number 11 on the Oricon Singles Chart.

Track listing

Musicians
Atsushi Sakuraivocals
Hisashi Imaiguitar
Hidehiko Hoshinoguitar
Yutaka Higuchibass
Toll Yagamidrums

References

External links
 

2012 singles
Buck-Tick songs
2012 songs
Songs with music by Hisashi Imai